Air China Flight 129 (CCA129/CA129) was a scheduled international passenger flight, operated by Air China, from Beijing Capital International Airport to Gimhae International Airport in Busan. On April 15, 2002, the aircraft on this route, a Boeing 767-200ER, crashed into a hill near the airport, killing 129 of the 166 people on board.

The Korea Aviation Accident Investigation Board published the final report in March 2005 and concluded that the crash was due to pilot error. The final report stated that the crew was inadvertently flying below the minimum safe altitude. Detailed information from the report also revealed that the pilots had been trained to conduct a circling approach in the airline's simulator only for Beijing Capital International Airport and never for a circling approach to Gimhae Airport's runway 18R. Subsequently, the report also blamed the tower controllers at Gimhae Airport for not using the tower BRITE and MSAW systems after losing visual contact with the aircraft. The Civil Aviation Administration of China responded to the Korean official report by pointing out that Park Junyong, the ATC official during the accident, was not licensed for air traffic control and issued incorrect orders due to his inexperience with the Boeing 767.

Flight 129 is currently recorded as the deadliest aviation accident in South Korea.

Accident 

The flight took off at 08:37 local time (00:37 UTC). After nearly two hours in flight, it arrived near Gimhae Airport in light rain and mist. 

At 11:16 local time (02:16 UTC), CA129 received clearance to use ILS approach to runway 36L, then circle to runway 18R (the same runway from the opposite direction) from Gimhae tower. During the circling approach to land on runway 18R, the crew exercised poor crew resource management and lost sight of the runway while delaying the base turn and flying outside of the circling approach area, and crashed into a hill at 11:21 local time (02:21 UTC). The aircraft made initial contact with the terrain when its right wing clipped a tree. It then impacted the ground, and the force of the impact broke the airplane apart. The right wing, empennage, left wing, parts of the fuselage and two engines separated. The plane then burst into flames, engulfing the cockpit and forward fuselage. The aircraft slid and destroyed several trees and 12 graves. Thirty-seven of those on board survived, including the captain. The post-impact fire was so hot that it melted the aluminum and other metals of the fuselage. The front part of the fuselage was completely destroyed, making it difficult for investigators to recognize it.

Aircraft 
The aircraft was a Boeing 767-200ER registered in China as B-2552. It was delivered in 1985 and had Boeing Serial Number 23308 and Line Number 127. It was previously operated by the Civil Aviation Administration of China (CAAC) and then transferred to Air China after CAAC's split. It had accumulated more than 40,000 hours of flying and about 14,500 flights.

Passengers and crew 

Among the 155 passengers, 135 were from South Korea, 19 were from China, and one was an Iranian-Uzbek who boarded to plane with an Uzbekistan passport. All 11 of the crew were from China.

The flight deck crew were:
 Captain Wu Xinlu (30). Captain Wu Xinlu entered the Civil Aviation Flying University of China in September 1990 and graduated in 1994. He then joined Air China, and in 2001 he was promoted to captain. After 26 November 2001, he began officially flying as a captain. He had 6,497 hours of flying experience (including 6,287 hours on the Boeing 767) and had flown five times to Busan.
 First Officer Gao Lijie   (29). First Officer (Co-Pilot) Gao Lijie  entered the Airforce Academy in August 1989 and graduated in September 1993. He joined Air China and completed his first flight as first officer on 23 February 2002. Prior to becoming a first officer, he had flown twice to Busan. He had accumulated 5,295 hours of flying experience, with 1,215 of them on the Boeing 767.
 Second Officer Hou Xiangning   (27). Second Officer (Third Pilot) Hou Xiangning attended the Civil Aviation Flying University of China from September 1993 to June 1997 and was hired by Air China in August 1997. Hou had no experience of landing in Busan. He had accumulated 1,775 hours of flying experience, including 1,078 hours on the Boeing 767.

The captain and two of the flight attendants survived.

Investigation

Weather
At Gimhae Airport, the winds come from the north in autumn and winter. However, in spring and summer, the winds come from the south. Visibility is often partially poor due to sea fog, since the southern part of the airport is located close to the sea. Mountainous terrain in the north with southerly winds prevailing may cause a mass of low clouds and fog to occur along the mountainous area north of Runway 18R, with a probability of increased precipitation in the area.

Weather at the time of crash was poor. Satellite imagery retrieved from the Korea Meteorological Administration radar showed that a large, wide area of rain clouds could be seen, starting from Busan to the southeast as far as Japan and moving slowly to the east. The clouds moved very slowly, and heavy clouds were seen lying in the sea south of Gimhae. Rescue squads at the crash site also reported that it was covered with thick fog, with the precipitation heavier than a drizzle.

Airport lighting
Investigators interviewed Captain Wu, who stated that as he observed the lights on the final approach course to Runway 36L, he saw that neither the runway approach lights on the downwind leg nor the circling guidance lights during the circling approach were on. According to the record of the automatic aeronautical light switching system and the testimony from the Gimhae Tower duty chief, the runway, approach lights and circling guidance lights were on at the time of the accident.

Survivors' statements
There were a total of 166 occupants on board, composed of 11 crew members and 155 passengers, including five children with ages ranging from three to nine years old. On the day of the accident, 39 people survived the crash with serious injuries. A passenger died the following day and 16 days later another passenger died.

Based on interviews of the survivors on board Flight 129, it was revealed that the accident occurred suddenly, with loud noise and violent shaking of the aircraft at the point of impact. All items inside the aircraft fell down, seats were thrust forward, and all lights went out, making it dark inside the aircraft. The fire filled the cabin with heavy smoke, which made it difficult to breathe. Most of the passengers briefly lost consciousness during impact, with the feet and legs of some passengers forced under the seats in front of them. A flight attendant who was seated at the aft right position stated that his body was crushed underneath something. He reached to open the door, but could not find the handle. He crawled out of the cabin and evacuated the survivors. The survivors then escaped by walking or crawling through the gaps in the broken fuselage. As they escaped, several large explosions were heard, with pillars of fire shooting up high into the sky.

The pre-flight safety demonstration and announcements were made in Chinese and English, but not in Korean. Some of the 135 Korean passengers stated they did not understand them. The Korean investigation board recommended that Air China add announcements in Korean to flights to and from South Korea.

Official report by the Korean authorities
Both the flight data recorder and the cockpit voice recorder were retrieved from the crash site and examined by investigators. The FDR data did not show any defect in the aircraft's controls and instruments.

The official accident report by the Korea Aviation Accident Investigation Board was released on 4 March 2005. The Probable Cause read:

The flight crew of flight 129 performed the circling approach, not being aware of the weather minima of wide-body aircraft (B767-200) for landing, and in the approach briefing, did not include the missed approach, etc., among the items specified in Air China’s operations and training manuals.
 The flight crew exercised poor crew resource management and lost situational awareness during the circling approach to runway 18R, which led them to fly outside of the circling approach area, delaying the base turn, contrary to the captain’s intention to make a timely base turn.
 The flight crew did not execute a missed approach when they lost sight of the runway during the circling approach to runway 18R, which led them to strike high terrain (mountain) near the airport.
 When the first officer advised the captain to execute a missed approach, about five seconds before impact, the captain did not react, nor did the first officer initiate the missed approach himself.

Official comments by the Chinese authorities
The Civil Aviation Administration of China published a 28-page side-by-side comments on the Korean official report. Besides, Liu Yajun, the head of the Chinese investigation team, pointed out,

 An ATC official in the airport, Park Junyong, was not licensed for air traffic control by the South Korean Construction and Transportation Ministry.
 Park did not know the properties of the aircraft, a Boeing 767, and mistakenly directed the airliner to descend to 700 feet (213.5 m) instead of directing the airliner to descend to 1,100 (335.5 m), which is the recommended safe altitude for a Boeing 767.
 The airport did not inform the crew of the weather conditions at the time. Eight flights before CA129 had been directed to land at other airports because of bad weather.
 There were also problems with the radar system and lighting at Gimhae Airport.

Television portrayal
The investigation was covered in "Turning Point", a 2017 episode (S17E03) of Mayday, a Canadian documentary television series about air crashes.

See also 

 Ground proximity warning system
Other similar accidents:
 1961 Ndola United Nations DC-6 crash, which caused the demise of Dag Hammarskjöld, then-Secretary-General of the United Nations
 1996 Croatia USAF CT-43 crash
 2020 Calabasas helicopter crash, which led to the death of basketball player Kobe Bryant
 Air Inter Flight 148
 AIRES Flight 8250
 American Airlines Flight 965
 Asiana Airlines Flight 733, the previous deadliest plane crash in South Korea which also happened under similar circumstances
 Cebu Pacific Flight 387, the second-deadliest aviation accident in the Philippines
 Crossair Flight 3597
 Dan-Air Flight 1008
 Garuda Indonesia Flight 152, the deadliest aviation accident in Indonesia
 Independent Air Flight 1851, the deadliest plane crash to occur in Portugal
 Korean Air Flight 801
 Prinair Flight 277
 Smolensk air disaster, which infamously killed Polish president Lech Kaczyński
 United Airlines Flight 2860
 Vietnam Airlines Flight 815

Notes

References

External links 

 
 
  - English Translation
  CA129 Final Report - Korea Aviation Accident Investigation Board - This is the original report; the English version states that if there are differences between the English and Korean versions, the Korean version has precedence.
 

2002 disasters in Asia
Airliner accidents and incidents involving controlled flight into terrain
Airliner accidents and incidents caused by pilot error
Aviation accidents and incidents caused by air traffic controller error
Airliner accidents and incidents involving fog
Aviation accidents and incidents in 2002
Aviation accidents and incidents in South Korea
Air China
Accidents and incidents involving the Boeing 767
2002 in South Korea
April 2002 events in South Korea